Christopher Judge is an American actor best known for playing Teal'c in the Canadian-American military science fiction television series Stargate SG-1, and Kratos in the 2018 video game God of War and its sequel God of War Ragnarök (2022). He attended the University of Oregon on a football scholarship and was a Pacific-10 Conference player.

Early life
Judge was born and raised in Los Angeles, California. He has one younger brother, Jeff Judge, also an actor.  Christopher wanted to be an actor from an early age, and studied drama in high school.  "The television set was my babysitter growing up. I can remember wanting to invoke the feelings that I was getting from television—I wanted to be the one who was the catalyst for those feelings in other people. Performing was something I've always known I was going to do."  He always knew that sports would be a stepping stone to an acting career. Judge was an All-L.A. City football player at Carson High School and graduated from Carson in 1982.  He played for Coach Gene Vollnogle.

Judge received a scholarship from the University of Oregon and played defensive back and safety for the Ducks from 1982 to 1985. He led in kickoff return yardage for 1983-84 and interceptions in 1984, and earned the Casanova Award in 1982, given to the freshman or newcomer of the year.  While at Oregon, Judge was a Pacific-10 Conference Selection in 1984 and played in the 1985 Hula Bowl.

Judge won a contest to host a radio show in Oregon, and in his senior year he won a regional contest to host the West Coast FOX KLSR Morning Show, an "MTV talk show type thing"; he used this experience to get an agent and move back to Los Angeles.

Career

Acting

In 1989 Judge began studying at the Howard Fine Studio in LA.  A few of his early roles were in the 1990s Bird on a Wire, Cadence, Neon Rider and MacGyver with future Stargate SG-1 star Richard Dean Anderson. In the ensuing years, Judge had small parts in various television shows and films such as 21 Jump Street (with future SG-1 director Peter DeLuise), The Fresh Prince of Bel-Air, and House Party 2, and as a regular on Sirens from 1994 to 1995.

Judge's largest role came in 1997 with Stargate SG-1. While at a friend's house, he saw his friend's roommate practicing for an audition for the show and was intrigued. While the roommate was away, Judge looked at the audition notes, then called his agent, insisted he get him an audition, or lose him as a client.  At the audition, there were three actors trying out for each of the other principal roles, but eight or ten for the role of Teal'c. Judge was confident that he had acquired the part when they dismissed everyone who had read for the part except him.

Judge's subsequent work includes guest spots on Andromeda, Stargate Atlantis, The Mentalist, the television film Personal Effects, and the films Snow Dogs and A Dog's Breakfast, the latter written and directed by fellow Stargate actor David Hewlett. Judge appeared in "Anonymous", the October 26, 2010 episode of NCIS: Los Angeles, and as one of Bane's henchmen in the 2012 film The Dark Knight Rises.

Writing
Judge wrote four Stargate SG-1 episodes: season five's "The Warrior", season six's "The Changeling", season seven's "Birthright", and season eight's "Sacrifices". 

After Stargate SG-1 was cancelled, Judge began writing a script for a show called Rage of Angels that would have enabled him to play "the lead in an hour formatted show and prove that a black lead can be commercially viable and sustainable in overseas markets." The script was marketed as a two-hour, back door pilot with MGM, but is now apparently with Direct TV and Starz Media.

Voice work

Judge has also done voice acting for animated series and video games, including Magneto on X-Men: Evolution, and the canceled Stargate SG-1: The Alliance. In the season eight episode, "Avatar", Teal'c informs SG-1 that he plays Def Jam Vendetta, alluding to the fact that Judge had provided the voice of D-Mob, the main antagonist in that game. He once again appeared as D-Mob in the sequel, Def Jam: Fight for NY, this time as a good guy and as the boss for your main character/hero. He is also known for voicing Jericho in Turok. 

Judge provided the voice of Zodak on the revived He-Man and the Masters of the Universe cartoon as well as Coach Grey in the Action Man CGI series. 

On June 14, 2016, Judge confirmed he was the voice actor for Kratos in the 2018 God of War, replacing long time Kratos voice actor Terrence C. Carson. He reprised the role in God of War Ragnarök.

Judge voiced King T'Challa/Black Panther in the August 2021 War for Wakanda DLC expansion of the Marvel's Avengers video game by Square Enix and Crystal Dynamics.

Personal life

Judge is involved with the Boys & Girls Clubs of Canada and is an avid golfer.

His son Cameron Judge is a professional Canadian football linebacker for the Calgary Stampeders. Cameron played college football for UCLA and was drafted 2nd overall in the 2017 CFL Draft; Christopher Jordan played college football for Cal Poly and was drafted 71st overall in the 2019 CFL Draft.

According to tweets from Judge, he could not walk in 2019, and he had to undergo surgery to have both his hips replaced, alongside back and knee surgery.

Awards and nominations
In 2002, Judge was nominated for a Saturn Award in the category of Best Supporting Actor in a Television Series for his work on Stargate SG-1. On February 13 at the 2019 D.I.C.E. Awards, Judge accepted the award for Outstanding Achievement in Character for his work as Kratos in God of War.

In 2019, Judge was nominated for the British Academy Games Award for Performer at the 15th British Academy Games Awards but he lost to his co-star Jeremy Davies. He was subsequently nominated for the Performer in a Leading Role at the 19th British Academy Games Awards in 2023.

In 2022, Judge won the award for Best Performance at Game Awards 2022 for his performance in God of War Ragnarök as Kratos.

Filmography

Film

Television

Video games

Writing

References

External links

1964 births
Living people
African-American male actors
American expatriate male actors in Canada
American male film actors
American male television actors
American male video game actors
American male voice actors
Black Canadian male actors
Oregon Ducks football players
University of Oregon alumni
21st-century African-American people
20th-century African-American people
Male actors from Los Angeles
The Game Awards winners
Interactive Achievement Award winners